Murs for President is the sixth studio album by American emcee MURS. The album was released on September 30, 2008 under Warner Bros. Records, making this his only album to date to be released under a major label.

Release 
The album debuted at No. 45 on Billboard 200 and No. 11 on Rap Albums, with 12,000 copies sold in its first week. It has sold 58,000 copies in the United States as of May 2015.

Track listing 
Unless otherwise noted, Information is based on Liner Notes

Sample Credits 
”I'm Innocent” samples “Innocent ‘Til Proven Guilty” (performed) by Honey Cone. 
”Lookin' Fly” samples “The Green Hornet Theme” by Al Hirt. 
”Can It Be” samples “I Wanna Be Where You Are” by Michael Jackson
”Everything” samples “I’ll Take Everything” by James Blunt.  
”Think You Know Me” samples “Moment of Truth” by The Originals.
”Me and This Jawn” samples “For the Love of You” by The Isley Brothers.
”Love and Appreciate II” samples “Now It’s Time to Say Goodbye” by Freda Payne. 
”Break Up (The OJ Song)” samples “Charlene” by Anthony Hamilton.
”Breakthrough” samples “Just Once” by The Main Ingredient.

Note
While the “I Wanna Be” Sample is credited to The Jackson 5 in the Liner Notes, the sampled song was actually performed by Michael Jackson.

Personnel
Information is based on the Album’s Liner notes
Murs - Rap Vocals (1-9, 11-15, Lead on 10), Executive Producer
9th Wonder -  Recording Engineer (12)
Christopher Avery - Recording Engineer (7-8, 10-11)
Calvin Bailiff - Recording Engineer (2, 15) 
Ted “Wild Animals” Chung - Audio Mixing (1), Executive Producer 
Aaron Dahl - Audio Mixing (2, 4-5, 8, 10-12, 14-15), Assistant Engineer (7)
DJ Quik - DJ Scratches (4), Audio Mixing (2, 4-5, 7-15)
Dylan Dresdow - Audio Mixing (3)
Carlitta Durand - Additional Vocals (15)
Kosta Elchev - Recording Engineer (4-6)
Evan Eneman - Additional Vocals (1)
Latonya “Tone Trezure” Givens - Background Vocals (10)
Chucc Hamilton - Additional Keyboards (9)
Chris Jackson - Recording Engineer (9)
Justin Keitt - Keyboards (1)
Padraic Kerin - Recording Engineer (3)
Khizman - Additional Lead Vocals (10)
Kokane - Additional Vocals (8)
Shvona Lavette - Additional Vocals (1)
Robert “Bubby” Lewis - Bass played by (4)
Victor Manzano - Recording Engineer (1, 14)
Terrace Martin - Recording Engineer (9, 13)
Steven Mudd - Assistant Engineer (3)
Sebastian Nova - Assistant Engineer (3)
Russell “Double R” Rededux - Executive Producer
Sukari Reid-Glenn - Flute (4)
Terrence “Scar” Smith - Additional Vocals (13)
LaToiya Williams - Additional Vocals (9)

Charts

Music videos 
 Better Than the Best
 Lookin' Fly
 Can It Be (Half a Million Dollars and 18 Months Later)
 Me and This Jawn
 A Part of Me
 Break Up (The OJ Song)
 The Science
 Road Is My Religion

MURS Administration 
MURS Administration is a mockumentary movie about MURS running for the President of Hip-Hop. In the movie he is opposed for the presidency by Swaggerty and Eniggama. The film runs for 27:00, and contains strong language and nudity.

References

External links 
 
 MURS artist page at Warner Bros. Records

2008 albums
Murs (rapper) albums
Warner Records albums
Albums produced by 9th Wonder
Albums produced by DJ Quik
Albums produced by Nottz
Albums produced by Scoop DeVille
Albums produced by Terrace Martin
Albums produced by will.i.am